This is a list of programs that have been broadcast by the Seven Network / 7HD, 7two, 7mate, 7Bravo, 7flix and Racing.com as well as regional affiliates, including Prime7, GWN7 and Channel Seven Regional as well as catch-up services 7plus. Some affiliate stations have alternate schedules and may air programs at different times.

Currently broadcast on Seven Network

Domestic

News and current affairs

Local productions
Seven News - Live and Fast-Tracked nightly 6pm evening bulletins produced locally in Syd/Melb/Bris/Adel/Per/GC/QLD 
Seven Afternoon News (Seven News at 4) - Exclusive weekdays 4pm5pm, produced locally in Syd/Melb/Bris/Adel/Per (2013–present)
National programs produced in Sydney
Seven Early News - weekdays 5am5:30am (2008–present)
Seven Morning News - Exclusive weekdays 11.30amnoon (2004–present)
The Latest: Seven News - Exclusive weeknights 10:30pm11pm (2018–present)
Seven News at 5 - Exclusive weekends 5pm5:30pm (2015–present)
Seven’s Sunrise - Live weekdays 5:30am9am (1991–1999, 2000–present)
Seven’s Weekend Sunrise - Live weekends 7am10am (2005–present)
The Morning Show - Exclusive weekdays 9am11:30am, weekends 10am12pm (2007–present)

Drama
Home and Away (1988–present)

Comedy
Fat Pizza: Back in Business (2000-2007 on SBS,)

Reality
Australia's Got Talent (2007- on Seven, on Nine,)
Australian Idol (2023-present, 2003-09 on Ten)
Big Brother (2020–present)
Dancing with the Stars (2004–present)
The Farmer Wants a Wife (2007- on Nine-present)
My Kitchen Rules (2010–2020, 2022-)

Observational / documentaries
Australia: Now and Then (2021–present)
Border Security: Australia's Front Line (2004–present)
Code 1: Minute by Minute (2022)
Manhunt (2017–present)
Outback Truckers (2012–present on 7mate)
Strike Force (2022)
Surveillance Oz (2012–present)
Surveillance Oz: Dash Cam (2016–present)
Towies (2017–present on 7mate)
Undercurrent (2019–present)

Game shows
The Chase Australia (2015–present)

Lifestyle
A Moveable Feast (Victoria) (2017–present)
Australia's Best Houses (2013–present on 7TWO)
Better Homes and Gardens (1995–present)
Cosmetic Coffee (2017–present)
Creek to Coast (Queensland) (2002–present)
The Franchise Show (2016–present)
The Great Australian Doorstep (2013–present on 7TWO)
Great Day Out (Queensland) (2017–present) - formally called The Great South East
The Great Weekend (Victoria) (2019–present)
 Helloworld (2019–present)
Home in WA (Western Australia) (2000–present)
House of Wellness (2017–present)
The Intolerant Cooks (2015–present on 7TWO)
Kochie's Business Builders (2009–present)
Melbourne Weekender (Victoria) (2006–present)
Queensland Weekender (Queensland) (2003–present)
SA Weekender (South Australia) (2017–present)
Sydney Weekender (New South Wales) (1994–present)
Vasili's Garden (2002-2007, 2008–2013 on Channel 31, 2007 on SBS, 2016–present on 7TWO)
WA Weekender (Western Australia) (2014–present)

Sports talk
The Front Bar (2015 on AFL.com.au, 2016–present on Seven/7mate)
The Kick (2012–2016 as "Toyota Saturday Pre-Game", 2017–present on Seven/7mate)
Sunday Footy Fest (2021–present)

Sports

 American football: NFL and Super Bowl (2015–present on 7mate)
 Australian rules football: AFL Premiership Season including AFL Grand Final and Brownlow Medal (1957–1986, 1988–2001, 2007–present on Seven & 7mate)
 Australian rules football: AFLW (Women's AFL) (2017–present on Seven & 7mate)
 Australian rules football: SANFL, VFL and WAFL (2015–present)
 Cricket: all domestic Test matches and all domestic Women's Internationals (2018–present)
 Cricket: KFC Big Bash League (2018–present) and Rebel Women's Big Bash League (2018–present)
 Cycling: Tour Down Under (2019–present)
 Golf: Australian Open (1989-2008, 2012–present)
 Golf: Australian PGA Championship (2014–present)
 Seven's Horse Racing coverage (2005–present in Seven & 7mate):
 Melbourne Spring Racing Carnival (2002-2006, 2013–present on Seven & 7TWO)
 Autumn Racing Carnival
 Magic Millions
 Motor racing: Repco Supercars Championship (1963-1996, 2007–2014, 2021–present) including Bathurst 1000 (1963-1996, 2007–2014, 2021–present)
 Summer Olympic Games: Tokyo 2020  (2021 on Seven, 7TWO & 7mate)
 Swimming: Australian Swimming Championships and Pan Pacific Swimming Championships (2016–2020 on Seven & 7TWO)
 Yachting: Sydney to Hobart Yacht Race (2005–present)

Children's

Beat Bugs (2016–present)
Drop Dead Weird (2017–19, 2022–present on 7flix)
Flushed (2015–present)
Get Arty (2017–present)
Get Clever (2018–present)
It's Academic (2005–present)
Match It (2012–present)
Motown Magic (2019, 2022–present on 7flix)
News of the Wild (2018–present)
The Wild Adventures of Blinky Bill (2016–18, 2020, 2022–present on 7flix)
ZooMoo (2016–present)

Annual events
Woolworths Carols in the Domain (1982–present)
Good Friday Appeal (1957–present) (Melbourne only)
Perth Telethon (1968–present) (Perth only)
Schools Spectacular (1984 to 2012 on ABC, 2013–2015 on Nine, 2016–2019 and 2021–present on Seven)
Victorian State Schools Spectacular (Melbourne only)
NSW Schools Spectacular Remixed (2020 on Seven) (Sydney only)

Foreign

Animation
American Dad! (2005–2010 on Seven, 2010–2021 on 7mate, 2021–present on 7flix)
Family Guy (1999–2010 on Seven, 2010–2021 on 7mate, 2021–present on 7flix)
Futurama (1999–2004 on Seven, 2019–present on 7mate and 7flix)
The Simpsons (2018–present on 7mate and 7flix)

Soap opera
Coronation Street (2022–present on 7two)
Emmerdale (2022–present on 7two)

Drama
9-1-1
9-1-1: Lone Star
The Blacklist
Chicago Fire 
God Friended Me
The Good Doctor 
How To Get Away With Murder (7flix)
Miss Scarlet and The Duke (7plus)
Proven Innocent (7plus)
Quantum Leap (2022 series)
The Resident 
Scandal (7flix)

Reality

The Amazing Race
America's Got Talent
American Pickers (7mate)
Britain's Got Talent
Hardcore Pawn (7mate)
Hotel Hell
Ink Master (7mate)
Pawn Stars (7mate)
Starstruck
Swamp People (7mate)

Lifestyle
60 Minute Makeover (7TWO)
Bargain Hunt (7TWO)
Escape to the Country (7TWO)
Homes Under the Hammer (7TWO)
Mums at the Table (7two)

Factual
River Monsters (7two)

Annual events
Academy Awards (2020–present)

Religious
 Life Today with James Robison (7two)
It Is Written
 Tomorrow's World
Leading The Way
David Jeremiah

Upcoming Series

Domestic

2023
 The 1% Club (game show)
 Animals Aboard with Dr Harry (factual)
 Armchair Experts (sports talk)
 Blow Up (reality)
 The Claremont Murders (drama)
 Con Girl (drama)
 Local Council (comedy)
 Million Dollar Island (reality)
 TV Week Logie Awards (Annual events, moved from Nine 1996–2022)
 We Interrupt This Broadcast (comedy)

TBA
 Apartment Rules (reality)
 Fam Time (dramedy)
 The Rich House (reality)

Foreign
 Accused (drama)
 Alert (drama)
 Litvinenko (drama)
 Lopez vs Lopez (drama)
 Without Sin (drama)
 A Year On Planet Earth

Formerly broadcast

Domestic

News and current affairs

11AM (1975–99)
The All In Call (for 7HD) (2009)
The Daily Edition (2013–20)
Face to Face (1995–97)
Hinch (1987–91)
News Overnight (1985)
Newsworld (1982–89)
Real Life (1992–94, became Today Tonight from 1995)
Seven News At 7 on 7Two (2013–14)
Seven’s COVID-19 Pandemic (31 December 2019 – 31 January 2022)
Sunday Night (2009–19)
Terry Willesee Tonight (1981–88)
Today Tonight (East Coast) (2002–14)
Today Tonight (Sydney, Melbourne versions) (1995–2002, replaced by East Coast Edition)
Today Tonight (Queensland) (1995–2003, 2013–14)
Today Tonight (Adelaide and Perth versions) (1995–2019)

Drama

800 Words (2015–2018)
Against the Wind (1978)
All Saints (1998–2009)
Always Greener (2001–2003)
Australian Gangster (2021)
The Battlers (1994)
Bony (1992)
The Blake Mysteries (2013-2017 on ABC, 2018 on Seven)
Blue Heelers (1994–2006)
Blue Murder: Killer Cop (2017)
Catching Milat (2015)
City Homicide (2007-2011)
Cop Shop (1977–1984) (moved to WIN)
A Country Practice (1981–1994)
Fam Time (2021)
Fire (1995-1996)
Flair (1990)
Hatton Garden (2021)
headLand (2005-2006)
Hoges: The Paul Hogan Story (2017)
Homicide (1964–1977) (moved to WIN)
INXS: Never Tear Us Apart (2014)
The Killing Field (2014)
Last Man Standing (2005)
Marshall Law (2002)
Molly (2016)
Ms Fisher's Modern Murder Mysteries (2019)
Murder Uncovered (2017)
Neighbours (1985 on Seven, 1986–2010 on Ten, 2011–2022 on 10 Peach)
Olivia: Hopelessly Devoted to You (2018)
Over the Hill (1994-1995)
Packed to the Rafters (2008-2013)
Peter Allen: Not The Boy Next Door (2015)
A Place To Call Home (2013–2014 on Seven, 2015–present on Foxtel)
The Power, The Passion (1989)
Secret Bridesmaids' Business (2019)
The Secret Daughter (2016–2017)
Skirts (1990)
Sons and Daughters (1982–1987)
Young Ramsay (1977–1980) (moved to WIN)
Wanted (2016–2018)
Wild Boys (2011)
Winter (2015)

Comedy

Acropolis Now (1989–1992)
Big Bite (2004)
Big Girl's Blouse (1994)
Birds in the Bush (1972)
Bobby Dazzler (1977–1978)
Bogan Hunters (2014–2015 on 7mate)
Brass Monkeys (1983)
Bullpitt! (1997-1998)
The Comedy Sale (1993)
The D-Generation (1988–1989)
Daily at Dawn (1981)
Doctor Down Under (1979–1980)
Double Take (2009)
The Eleventh Hour (1985)
Fam Time (2021)
Fast Forward (1989–1992)
Full Frontal (1993–1997)
Hamish and Andy (2004)
Hampton Court (1991)
Hey Dad..! (1987–1994)
Housos vs Virus: The Lockdown (2020 on 7mate)
Housos: The Thong Warrior (2022 on 7mate)
Jimeoin (1994–1995)
Kath & Kim (2002-04 on ABC, 2007)
Kingswood Country (1980–1984)
Kinne (2014–2015 on 7mate)
Let Loose Live (2005)
Newlyweds (1993–1994)
Orange Is the New Brown (2018)
TV Burp (2009)

Animation
Regular Old Bogan (2020 on 7mate)

Variety / Entertainment

Andrew Denton's Interview (2018–2019)
At Home with John Mangos (1994-1995)
The Bert Newton Show (1989)
Behave Yourself! (2017)
Best Bits (2016)
The Big Music Quiz (2016)
The Chat Room (2003)
Denise (1998–2001)
Denton (1994-1995)
The Eric Bana Show Live (1997)
Funniest People (1995)
Greeks On The Roof (2004)
Kidspeak (1998)
Late Night with Jono and Dano (1986)
Little Big Shots (2017–2018)
The Mavis Bramston Show (1964-1967)
Mesmerised (2015)
Mulray (1994-1995)
The Naked Vicar Show (1977–1978)
The Night Cap (2008 via 7HD)
The Norman Gunston Show (1975–1979, 1993)
Out of the Question (2008)
Pictures of You (2012)
SlideShow (2013)
Thank God You're Here (2006-2007 on Ten, 2009)
This is Your Laugh (2008 via 7HD)
Tonight Live with Steve Vizard (1990-1993)
The Unbelievable Truth (2012)
The White Room (2010)
You May Be Right (2006)

Reality

10 Years Younger in 10 Days (2009)
All Together Now (2018)
The Amazing Race Australia (2011-2014, 2019–present on Network 10)
Aussie Barbecue Heroes (2015)
Australian Spartan (2018–2019)
Back with the Ex (2018)
Battle of the Choirs (2008)
Beauty and the Geek Australia (2009-2012)
The Big Adventure (2014)
Bride & Prejudice (2017–2019)
Bringing Sexy Back (2014)
Celebrity Splash! (2013)
Celebrity Survivor (2006) (Australian Survivor franchise transferred to Network Ten from 2016)
The Club (2002)
Dance Boss (2018)
Dancing with the Stars (2004–2015 on Seven, 2019– on Ten)
First Dates (2016–2020)
Formal Wars (2013)
Hell's Kitchen Australia (2017)
Holey Moley (2021)
House Rules (2013–2020)
How Much Do You Love Me? (2000)
Instant Hotel (2017–2019)
It Takes Two (2006–2009)
Kiss Bang Love (2016)
Ladies' Night (2019)
Last Chance Learners (2007)
Mates on a Mission (2022)
Make Me A Supermodel (2008)
The Mentor (2018)
The Mole (2000–2003, 2005, 2013)
The Real Dirty Dancing (2019)
The Proposal (2019)
The Super Switch (2019)
My Restaurant Rules (2004–2005)
The One (2008)
Playing It Straight (2004)
Please Marry My Boy (2012-2013)
Pooch Perfect (2020)
Popstars (2000–2002)
Popstars Live (2004)
Restaurant Revolution (2015)
Seven Year Switch (2016–2017)
The Single Wives (2018)
The X Factor (2005 on Ten, 2010–2016 on Seven)
Treasure Island (2000 on Seven)
Ultimate Tag (2021)
Yummy Mummies (2017 on Seven, 2018 on 7plus)
Zumbo's Just Desserts (2016, 2019)

Lifestyle

Around the World with Manu (2016 on 7TWO)
Auction Squad (2001–2004)
The Aussie Property Flippers (2017)
Australia's Best Backyards (2007)
Coxy's Big Break (Victoria) (2004-2015)
Discover Tasmania
Food 4 Life (2007, 4ME: 2011-)
Good Chef, Bad Chef (2006–2007) (now on Network Ten)
The Great Outdoors (1992–2010)
The Great South East (Queensland) (1997–2016) - Replaced by/Renamed to Great Day Out
Ground Force (1999–2004)
Guide to the Good Life
Harry's Practice (1997–2003)
House Calls to the Rescue
New Idea Saturday Kitchen (2004–2006)
New Idea TV (2008?)
No Leave, No Life (2009-2012)
The Outdoor Room (2008)
Room for Improvement (2000–2003)
SA Life (South Australia) (2010-2016)
Surprise Chef (2001-2003)
Talk to the Animals (1993-1996)
What Not To Wear Australia (2004)
Your Life on the Lawn (2003)

Observational / documentaries

Air Ways (2009-2011)
Anh Does (2012–2015)
Australia: The Story of Us (2015)
Australia's Cheapest Weddings (2016)
Beach Cops (2015–2018)
Beyond 2000 (Seven Network 1985–1993; Network Ten 1993–1998; Seven Network 1999)
Beyond The Darklands (2009)
Beyond Tomorrow (2005–2006)
Bush Doctors (2008)
Coastwatch Oz (2014)
Conviction Kitchen (2011)
Crash Investigation Unit (2008-2011)
Emergency Call (2018)
Find My Family (2008-2010)
The Force: Behind the Line (2006–2019)
Gangs of Oz (2009)
Gold Coast Medical (2016–2017)
Highway Patrol (2009–2019)
Inside "The G" (2019)
ICU (2010)
Last Chance Surgery (2009)
Medical Emergency (2006-2010)
Medical Incredible (2005)
Medical Rookies (2005)
Motorbike Cops (2018–2019)
Murder Uncovered (2017)
My France with Manu (2014–2015)
My Ireland with Colin (2015)
Million Dollar Cold Case (2017)
Outback Wildlife Rescue (2008)
Police Files: Unlocked (2006-2008)
The Real Seachange (2006)
RSPCA Animal Rescue (2007-2012)
Surf Patrol (2007-2009)
This Is Your Life (1975–1980)
Top 40 Celebrity Countdown (2007)
Triple Zero Heroes (2009)
What Really Happens in Bali (2014)
What Really Happens in Thailand (2015)
Where Are They Now? (2006-2008)
Wildlife with Olivia Newton-John (1995-1996)
Jimmy Barnes: Working Class Boy (2018)
The World Around Us (1979–2006)
World's Strictest Parents (2009-2012)
Young, Lazy and Driving Us Crazy (2014)
yourHOUSE (2005)
You've Got the Job (2006)
The Zoo (2008-2010)

Game shows

All-Star Squares (1999)
Australia's Brainiest Kid (Seven Network 2004; Network Ten 2005-2007 as Australia's Brainiest)
Beat The Star (2010)
Blind Date (1974)
Blockbusters (1990–1994)
Cannonball (2017)
Catch Us If You Can
Celebrity Tattletales (1980)
C'mon, Have A Go! (1985-1986)
Coles £3000 Question and Coles $6000 Question (1960–1971)
Concentration (1970s, 1997)
Seven’s Deal Or No Deal (2003-2013)
Dog Eat Dog (2002–2003)
The Dulux Show (1957)
Family Feud (1988–1996)
Gladiators (1995–1996, 2008)
Great Temptation (1970–1976)
Have a Go (1987)
High Rollers (1975)
Hot Streak (1998)
It Pays to Be Funny (1957–1958)
Jeopardy! (1970-1978)
Letterbox and $50,000 Letterbox (1963, 1981)
The Love Game (1984)
The Main Event (1991–1992)
Man O Man (1994)
The Master (2006)
Midnight Zoo (2006)
Million Dollar Chance Of A Lifetime (1999–2000)
Million Dollar Minute (2013-2015) 
Minute to Win It (2010)
National Bingo Night (2007)
Now You See It (1985–1996)
Opportunity Knocks (1977–1978)
Perfect Match (2002)
Pick a Box (1957–1971)
Play Your Cards Right (1984)
Press Your Luck (1987–1988)
The Pressure Pak Show (1957–1958)
The Price is Right  (original format) (1957–1959, 1963)
The New Price is Right (1981-1985)
The Price is Right (2012-2013)
Quiz Master (2002)
The Rich List (2007-2008)
Stop the Music (1950s)
Take a Chance (1959)
Take Me Out (2018)
Talking Telephone Numbers (1996)
Total Recall (1994–1995)
The Trivial Video Show (1986)
TV Talent Scout (1957–1958)
Video Village (1962-1966)
The Wall (2017)
The Weakest Link (2001–2002)
Wheel of Fortune: The Original Series (1981–2004, 2006 [unscreened episodes])
Larry Emdur & Laura Csortan's Wheel of Fortune (2005-2006) 
Who Dares Wins (1996–1998)
Win Roy and HG's Money (2000)
Wipeout (1999–2000)

Children's

The Adventures of the Bush Patrol (1996–98)
The Adventures of Candy Claus (1990)
The Adventures of Long John Silver (1958)
The DaVincibles (2011–15)
Agro's Cartoon Connection (1989–97)
A*mazing (1994–98)
Backyard Science (2004–10)
Bailey's Bird (1979)
Bay City (1993)
The Big Arvo (2000–04)
The Big Breakfast (1999–2000)
Blinky Bill's Around the World Adventure (2004–09) (later on ABC)
Blinky Bill's White Christmas
The Book Place (1991–2003, 2010–11 on 7TWO)
Boris's Breakfast Club (Brisbane only)
Bottersnikes and Gumbles (2015–16, 2018–20)
Butterfly Island (1987–93, originally on ABC)
The Camel Boy
Carrots
The Cartoon Connection (1985–89, 1997–99)
Cartoon Corner
Castaway (2011–12, 2014)
Chuck Finn
Crash Zone (1999–2001, 2008 on 7HD)
The Deep (2015–20)
Dive Olly Dive (2005–14)
Dot and the Kangaroo films
The Dudley Dog Show (1975)
Dumb Bunnies
The Early Birds
Erky Perky (2006–13)
Fairy Tale Police Department (2002–07)
Fat Cat and Friends (1988–92, originally on Network Ten)
Flipper and Lopaka (later on ABC)
Funshine (1976–79)
Ghosts of Time (2012–15)
Girl TV (2003–04, 2008)
Gloria's House (2000–01)
Go Go Stop (2004–11)
The Greatest Tune on Earth (1990–92)
Gumnutz
Hairy Legs (2014–18)
Halfway Across The Galaxy and Turn Left (1992, rerun 1997)
History Hunters (2013–15, 2017–18 on 7flix)
In Your Dreams (2013–19)
Jolly Gene and His Fun Machine (1957)
Kaboodle (1990–93, originally on ABC, returned to air on ABC)
Kid Detectives (2009–11)
Kids Only! - KO! (1979)
Kitty is Not a Cat (2017–20)
Lab Rats Challenge (2012–15) (originally on Nine Network, later on ABC3)
Larry the Wonderpup (2018–20)
Legend of Enyo (2010–13)
Li'l Horrors (2000–02)
Marco Polo Junior Versus the Red Dragon (was broadcast on television with a new name called The Magic Medallion)
Master Raindrop (2008–12)
Mission Top Secret (1991)
The New Tomorrow (2005–09)
Oh Yuck! (2017–19)
The Quiz Kids (1964–68)
Romper Room (1963–88)
Round the Twist (1989, later on ABC)
Sally Bollywood: Super Detective (2010–17, 2020 on 7flix)
Saturday Disney (1990–2016)
Saturdee (1986)
Scrooge Koala's Christmas (1997)
Sea Princesses (2007–14)
Seaside Hotel (2003–09)
Seven's Super Saturday
Shirl's Neighbourhood (1979–83)
Short Cuts (2001)
Silversun
Sky Trackers (1994)
Spit It Out (2010–15, 2017–21 on 7flix)
Staines Down Drains (2006–10)
Street Football
The Super Sunday Show
Tabaluga (1997-2007)
Tashi (2014–19)
Teenage Fairytale Dropouts (2012–17)
The Three Musketeers
Time Masters (1996–98)
Time Trackers (2008–11)
Trapped (2008–11, 2013)
The Tripods (1984–85, in conjunction with the BBC)
Wicked
Wipe Out (1999–2000)
Wombat (1983–88)
The Woodlies (2012–16, 2017 on 7flix)
Young Seven
Zeke's Pad (2008–13)

Preschool
All for Kids (2008–2013)
Bambaloo (2003–2007, 2011 on 7TWO)
The Fairies (2005–2012)
Jay's Jungle (2015–2019)
Lah-Lah's Adventures (2014–2016)
Larry the Lawnmower (2008–2011, 2015–2018 on 7TWO)
Pipsqueaks (2013–2020)
Playhouse Disney (2004–2008)
Raggs (2006–2012)
Toybox (2010–2020)
The Wiggles series (1998)

Music
AMV: All Music Video (2000–2002)
Eclipse Music TV (2005–2009)
Saturday Morning Live (1988-1990)
Video Smash Hits (1990-1994)

Soap opera
The Power, The Passion (1989)

Sports talk

100% Tony Squires (2004)
AFL Game Day (2008–2020)
The Bounce (2010)
The Cream (2003)
The Dream in Athens with Roy and HG (2004)
The Dream with Roy and HG (2000)
Four Quarters (1995)
The Ice Dream with Roy and HG (2002)
Live and Kicking (1998-1999)
The Matty Johns Show (2010)
Road to Rio (2016)
The Monday Dump (2001-2002)
Rex Hunt's Footy Panel (1994-2003)
Santo, Sam and Ed's Sports Fever! (2012)
Sportsworld (1990-2006)
Talking Footy (1994-2004; 2013–2020 on Seven/7mate)
V8Xtra (2007-2014)
World of Sport (1959–1987)
Yum Cha (2008)

Sports

 Basketball: NBL (1988–1991)
 Horse Racing: Emirates Melbourne Cup Carnival (2002–2018)
 Rugby league: New South Wales Rugby League (1970s-1980s)
 Rugby League: Australian Tests and Tours (1990-1993)
 Rugby League: World Cups (2013 and 2017)
 Rugby union: Super 12 (1996-2003), Wallabies Rugby Internationals (1996-2010), Rugby World Cup (1999, 2003)
 Rugby union: Shute Shield (2015–2020 on 7TWO in NSW only, other states on 7mate, Now on Stan)
 Soccer: NSL (1977-2004)
 Tennis: Australian Open including Hopman Cup, Brisbane International, Sydney International and Kooyong Classic (1973–2018)

Annual events
 AACTA Awards (2013-2015 on Ten, 2015–2020 on Seven)
 Australia Day Live Concert (now on ABC)
 Darling Harbour Christmas Pageant (now on 10)

Foreign

Soap opera

All My Children
Berrenger's
Generations
Knots Landing
Passions
Rituals
Texas

Animation

Clerks: The Animated Series
Duckman 
The Flintstones' 25th Anniversary Celebration
Footrot Flats: The Dog's Tale
God, the Devil and Bob
King of the Hill 
Rock and Rule
Wait Till Your Father Gets Home

Drama

21 Jump Street (originally aired on Nine Network)
24 
77 Sunset Strip
The Adventures of Sherlock Holmes
The Adventures of the Black Stallion
The Adventures of William Tell
Against the Wall
Agent Carter (2016)
Agents of S.H.I.E.L.D. (7flix)
Airwolf
Alias
All Creatures Great and Small
Ally McBeal
Alphas
Amazing Grace
American Dreams
The American Embassy
American Odyssey
Angel (later aired on Network Ten and Eleven)
Aquarius
Babylon 5
Bad Girls
Band of Gold
Bates Motel
The Bay
Beacon Hill
BeastMaster
Beggarman, Thief
Beggars and Choosers
Bergerac (in conjunction with the BBC)
The Best Times
Between the Lines
Big Shamus, Little Shamus
Billionaire Boys Club
Bionic Woman
Blindspot
Body of Proof (2011-2013)
Bodies of Evidence
Bones
Boomtown
Boston Legal
Boston Public
Boys from the Bush
Brotherhood of the Rose
Brothers & Sisters
Buffy the Vampire Slayer (later moved to Network Ten and Eleven)
Cagney and Lacey
Carbie
Castle
The Chase
Cheat 
Chicago Hope
CHiPs
Circus Boy
City Central
Cleaning Up 
The Closer 
Cobra
Code Black (7flix)
Codename: Kyril
Commander in Chief
Coronation Street (later aired on SBS)
Covert Affairs
Cover Up
Criminal Minds
Criminal Minds: Beyond Borders
Crossing Jordan
Cruel Doubt
The Cult
Dark Angel
Dark Justice
The Darling Buds of May
David Cassidy: Man Undercover
Day Break
Deadly Games
Dear John
Death of an Expert Witness
Dempsey & Makepeace
Department S
Desperate Housewives
Detective in the House
Detroit 1-8-7
Diamonds
Dirty Dancing
Disraeli
Double Dare (not to be confused with the Nickelodeon game show of the same name)
Downton Abbey
Due South
The Duke
Edward the Seventh
Eerie, Indiana
The Equalizer
The Event
F/X: The Series
Falcon Crest
Fame
Felicity
Flash Gordon
FlashForward
Fly by Night
Forever Knight
Fortune Dane
Freshman Dorm
GCB
Generations
Ghost Whisperer
Gideon's Crossing
Gormenghast
The Greatest American Hero (originally aired on Network Ten and ABC)
Grey's Anatomy (2005–2018 on Seven, 2018–2021 on 7flix, moved to Disney+)
Grimm
Hammer House of Horror
Hang Time
The Hardy Boys/Nancy Drew Mysteries
Hawaiian Eye
Heartbeat 
Hearts Are Wild
Heroes
Heroes Reborn
Highlander: The Series
Hill Street Blues 
Homefront
Homicide: Life on the Street
Hong Kong
Huff
Hung
Hunter
In the Heat of the Night
The Incredible Hulk (1978)
Inspector Morse
The Invisible Man (1958)
Ironside
Island Son
I Spy (1965)
Jack the Ripper
JAG (later moved to Network Ten and Eleven)
Jessie
Jungle Jim
Just Deal
Kay O'Brien
Key West
Knightwatch
Lady Blue
Largo Winch
Law & Order: Los Angeles
Leap Years
Lexx
Liar
The Life and Loves of a She-Devil
Lillie
Lime Street
The Lineup
Lois and Clark: The New Adventures of Superman
The Lone Gunmen
Lost
Lost in Space
Lucky Chances
MacGyver
Maigret
The Man from U.N.C.L.E.
Manhunt
Mancuso, F.B.I.
Mapp and Lucia
Martial Law
McMillan & Wife
Medical Center
Midnight Caller
Misfits of Science
Missing
Miss Marple (in conjunction with the BBC)
Mistresses
Mitch
Moody and Pegg
Motive (7flix)
Mrs. Biggs
Murder City
Mutant X
Nash Bridges 
The New Untouchables
Night Heat
Nightmare Cafe
The Nightmare Years
Nowhere Man
The Oldest Rookie
One West Waikiki
Once & Again
Once Upon a Time (7flix)
Once Upon a Time in Wonderland (2016)
The Onedin Line
Our Family Honor
Our House
The Outer Limits
The Pallisers
The Passage
Peak Practice
Perry Mason
The Persuaders!
Peter Gunn
Phantom Agents
The Player
Police Woman
Popular
Poltergeist: The Legacy
The Practice
Private Practice
The Professionals
Profiler
Providence
Quantico (7flix)
Quincy, M.E.
Reckless
Red Widow
Rescue 8 (also airs on Nine Network in Victoria)
Resurrection
The Return of Sherlock Holmes
Return of the Saint
Revenge (2012-2015)
Rituals
The River
RoboCop: The Series
Room 222
The Rousters
Royal Pains
Rush Hour
The Saint
Shaft
Shannon's Deal
Sherlock Holmes
Sidekicks
Simon & Simon
The Six Million Dollar Man
Snoops
Space: Above and Beyond
Space Precinct
Special Branch
Spies
Standoff
Stargate SG1
State of Affairs
Stephen King's Kingdom Hospital
Stingray
The Streets of San Francisco
Superior Court
The Sweeney
Sweet Valley High
T. and T.
T.J. Hooker
Tales from the Crypt
Tales of the Gold Monkey
Titanic miniseries
Thirtysomething
Threat Matrix
Thriller
Time of Your Life
Time Trax
A Touch of Frost
Tour of Duty
Trapper John, M.D.
The Troubleshooters
Tru Calling
UFO
Ultimate Force
Unsolved Mysteries
Vanished
Vera (Now on ABC)
The Village
The Wackiest Ship in the Army
When the Boat Comes In
The White Shadow
Whiz Kids
William and Mary
Windmills of the Gods
Wings
Wiseguy
Within These Walls

Comedy

The 100 Lives of Black Jack Savage
227
30 Rock
3rd Rock from the Sun
The 5 Mrs. Buchanans
8 Simple Rules
The Abbott and Costello Show
According to Jim 
Adam's Rib
After Henry (originally aired on ABC)
ALF (later moved to Nine)
Alas Smith and Jones
'Allo 'Allo! 
Ally McBeal
All-New British Bloopers
Almost Home
Almost Perfect
American Dreamer
Andy Capp 
Are You Being Served? (originally aired on ABC)
Arli$$
Arrested Development 
Assaulted Nuts
Babes in the Wood
Baby Boom
Baby Makes Five
Barney Miller
Batman
The Benny Hill Show (originally aired on Network Ten)
Bent
Best Friends Forever
Best of the West
Better Days
The Beverly Hillbillies
Bewitched (originally aired on Nine)
Birds of a Feather
The Black Adder (1983, in conjunction with the BBC)
Blackadder II 
Blackadder the Third 
Blackadder Goes Forth 
Bless This House
Blossom
The Bounder
Boy Meets World
The Brady Brides
Brotherly Love
The Brothers
Brothers
Brothers and Sisters
Café Americain
California Dreams
Carol & Company
Carry On Laughing
Carter Country
Car 54, Where Are You?
Cedric the Entertainer Presents
Charles in Charge
Chef!
City Guys
Close to Home
Clueless 
Conrad Bloom
The Crew
Cutters
The Dame Edna Experience
The Danny Thomas Show
Dave Allen at Large
Dear John
The Debbie Reynolds Show
Dennis the Menace (also airs Nine Network and Network Ten as "Channel 0")
Dharma & Greg (later aired on Network Ten)
The Dick Emery Show
Dinosaurs
Doctor at Sea
Doctor in Charge
Doctor in the House
Doctor on the Go
Doc
The Doris Day Show
Down and Out in Beverly Hills
Duty Free
Eight is Enough
Ellen
The Ellen Burstyn Show
Empty Nest
Even Stevens
Ever Decreasing Circles
Everybody Loves Raymond (later moved to Network Ten and Eleven)
Family Affair
A Family for Joe
The Family Man
Family Matters
Family Ties (later moved to Nine)
The Fanelli Boys
The Fantastic Miss Piggy Show
Farrington of the F.O.
Father, Dear Father
Father Knows Best
Fawlty Towers (originally aired on ABC, 7TWO)
The Fenn Street Gang
Fish
Flesh 'n' Blood
The Flying Nun
French and Saunders
Fresh Fields (originally aired on ABC)
Friends (later moved to Nine)
Full House (later moved to Nine in the early 1990s)
Galavant (2016)
The Gale Storm Show
Gary Unmarried
GCB
The George Carlin Show
Get Some In!
Get Smart 
Gidget
Gimme a Break!
The Golden Girls 
The Golden Palace
The Good Life (originally aired on ABC)
Good Morning Miss Bliss
The Goodies (originally aired on ABC)
Grace Under Fire
Grandfathered (7flix)
Grounded For Life
Guys Next Door
Hallelujah!
Hammer, Slammer, & Slade
Hang Time
Hangin' with Mr. Cooper
Happy Endings
Happy Family
Hazel
He's the Mayor
Here's Lucy (originally aired on Nine Network, later aired on ABC then returned to air on Nine in 1996)
Herman's Head
Hi-de-Hi!
High & Dry
Hiller and Diller
His and Hers
The Hogan Family 
Holding the Fort
Holmes & Yoyo
The Home Court
Home Improvement
Home James! (originally aired on ABC)
Home to Roost
The Honeymooners
Honey, I Shrunk the Kids: The TV Show
Hope & Faith
How I Met Your Mother
The Hughleys
Hung
I Dream of Jeannie (originally aired on Nine)
I Love Lucy (originally aired on Nine Network, later aired on ABC then returned to air on Nine in 1995)
In Case of Emergency
In Loving Memory
Is It Legal?
It Ain't Half Hot Mum (originally aired on ABC)
It Had to Be You
It's Always Sunny in Philadelphia
The Jack Benny Program
James at 15
Jo Brand Through the Cakehole
Joe & Valerie
The John Forsythe Show
Just Like Family
Just Our Luck
Karen
Kate and Allie
Keeping Up Appearances (originally aired on ABC)
The Knights of Prosperity
The Last Frontier
Laugh-In (originally aired on Network Ten as Channel 0)
Laurel and Hardy
Leave It to Beaver (originally aired on Nine)
Less Than Perfect
Let There Be Love
Love and Marriage
Love Thy Neighbour 
Loves Me, Loves Me Not
Mack & Myer for Hire
Malibu, CA
Mama's Family
Mann's Best Friends
The Mary Tyler Moore Show
Mr. Bean
Man Up!
M*A*S*H (originally aired on Network Ten)
Maybe This Time
McHale's Navy
The McLean Stevenson Show
Me and My Girl
Mind Your Language
Minder (originally aired on ABC)
The Mindy Project
Misery Loves Company
Mister Ed (originally aired on ABC)
Mixed Blessings
The Mommies
Mr. Bean (originally aired on ABC from 1991 to 1996, later screened on ABC)
Mr. Belvedere
Mrs. Brown's Boys
Mr. Rhodes
Mr. Smith
The Monkees
Monty Python's Flying Circus (originally aired on ABC, later returned to air on ABC in late 1995)
The Morecambe & Wise Show
The Munsters (later aired on Network Ten)
The Muppets
The Muppets at Walt Disney World
Muppets Tonight
The Muppet Show (later aired on Network Ten)
My Husband and I
My Favorite Martian (originally aired on ABC)
My Name is Earl
My Three Sons
My Wife and Kids 
Nearly Departed
Never the Twain
A New Kind of Family
The New Leave It to Beaver
The New Statesman
No, Honestly
Not Necessarily the News
Not the Nine O'Clock News
Nurses
The Nutt House
Oh, Doctor Beeching!
On the Buses
On the Rocks
One Day at a Time
One of the Boys (1989 series)
Only Fools and Horses
Open All Hours (originally aired on ABC)
Our Man Higgins
Our Miss Brooks
Outsourced
Pacific Station
Parks and Recreation
The Partners
The Partridge Family (later moved to Nine)
Perfect Strangers (later moved to Nine)
Pete and Gladys
Petticoat Junction
The Phil Silvers Show (originally aired on ABC)
The PJs
Please Sir!
Police Squad!
Porridge 
Punky Brewster 
The Pursuit of Happiness
Reaper
Reba
The Redd Foxx Show
Rising Damp
The Rob Nelson Show
Room at the Bottom
The Ropers
Roseanne (originally aired on Network Ten)
Sabrina, the Teenage Witch
Samantha Who?
Sara
Saved by the Bell
Saved by the Bell: The New Class
Sergeant Bilko
Scrubs
Shadows
Shelley
Shut That Door!
The Sinbad Show
Singles
Sister, Sister
The Slap Maxwell Story
Smart Guy
Some Mothers Do 'Ave 'Em (originally aired on ABC)
Sports Night
Stacked
Stark Raving Mad
Step by Step (later moved to Nine)
Still Standing
Still the Beaver
Struck by Lightning
Tabitha
Tammy
Teachers Only
Teen Angel
That Girl
That '70s Show 
There Comes a Time 
Thick as Thieves
Three of a Kind
The Three Stooges (originally aired on Nine)
The Tom Ewell Show
The Torkelsons
The Two Ronnies
To the Manor Born (originally aired on ABC, also aired on Network Ten)
Too Close for Comfort
Ugly Betty 
Unhappily Ever After
Up the Elephant and Round the Castle
USA High
Valerie
Valerie's Family
Walter & Emily
Welcome Back, Kotter
Whack-O!
When Things Were Rotten
Where I Live
Whitney
Will & Grace (later aired on Network Ten)
Woops!
Working
Yes, Dear
The Young Ones (originally aired on ABC, also aired on Network Ten)
Yus, My Dear
Zoe, Duncan, Jack and Jane

Variety / entertainment
The Dr. Oz Show (7TWO)
The Grand Tour (Now only on Amazon Prime Video)
The Martha Stewart Show (7TWO)
Ricki Lake
Sha Na Na

Game shows
The Generation Game

Reality

Age of Love
Beauty and the Geek (ex-7TWO)
Breaking the Magician's Code: Magic's Biggest Secrets Finally Revealed (ex-7TWO, ex-7mate)
Commando: On The Front Line
I Survived A Japanese Game Show (ex-7TWO)
Jersey Shore
Joe Millionaire
The Legion
Meet My Folks
Name Your Adventure
Playing It Straight
Power of Attorney
Ramsay's Kitchen Nightmares
Seven Year Switch (USA) (2016)
The Test
That's Incredible!
Treasure Hunters
Unsolved Mysteries

Lifestyle
What Not to Wear

Observational / documentaries
Airline USA
Autopsy: The Last Hours Of...
The Beatles Anthology
Border Patrol
Coastwatch
Donald Duck's 50th Birthday (also on Network Ten in Sydney)
Fight for Life
Gordon, Gino and Fred: Road Trip
Innovation
Martin Clunes: Islands of America
Michael Palin's New Europe
Mickey's 50
Mickey's 60th Birthday
Motorway Patrol
Police Camera Action!
SCU: Serious Crash Unit
Unsolved Mysteries (later aired on Network Ten)

Western

Alias Smith and Jones
Casey Jones
The Cisco Kid
Colt .45
Frontier Doctor
Gunsmoke
Have Gun – Will Travel
The Lazarus Man
Mackenzie's Raiders
The Oregon Trail
Outlaws
Rawhide
The Restless Gun
Tales of the Texas Rangers
Union Pacific
The Virginian (originally aired on Nine)
Wanted Dead or Alive
The Young Riders

Anthology
Academy Theatre
Desilu Playhouse
Disney's Wonderful World
Disneyland
Donald Duck's 50th Birthday
Freddy's Nightmares
Insight
The Magical World of Disney
Mickey's 50
Mickey's 60th Birthday
The Wonderful World of Disney

Children's

101 Dalmatians: The Series
The 13 Ghosts of Scooby-Doo
2 Stupid Dogs
The 7D (2016–18)
The Abbott and Costello Cartoon Show (later on Network Ten and ABC)
Action Man A.T.O.M.
The Addams Family (1973)
The Addams Family (1992)
Adventures from the Book of Virtues
The Adventures of Black Beauty
The Adventures of Champion
The Adventures of Don Coyote and Sancho Panda
The Adventures of the Galaxy Rangers
The Adventures of Gulliver (originally on ABC)
Adventures of the Gummi Bears
The Adventures of Huckleberry Finn
The Adventures of Mickey and Donald
The Adventures of Mole
The Adventures of Noddy
The Adventures of Pow Wow (also on Nine Network in Victoria)
The Adventures of Rin Tin Tin
The Adventures of Rupert Bear
The Adventures of Toad
The Adventures of Twizzle (also on Nine Network in Victoria)
Afterschool Specials
Aladdin
ALF: The Animated Series
ALF Tales
Alice in Wonderland or What's a Nice Kid Like You Doing in a Place Like This?
Aliens First Christmas
All Dogs Go to Heaven: The Series
The All-New Popeye Show
Alpha Teens On Machines
The Alvin Show (originally on ABC and Network Ten)
The Amazing Chan and the Chan Clan
American Dragon: Jake Long (2005–09)
Animated Adventures of Tom Sawyer (Perth only)
A.N.T. Farm (2012–17)
Arabian Nights
Archie's TV Funnies
Archie's Weird Mysteries
Around the World in 80 Days
Around the World in 80 Dreams
Asterix in Britain
Astro Boy (1960)
The Atom Ant Show (originally aired on ABC)
Austin & Ally (2013–18)
Avenger Penguins (2009–11, originally on ABC)
Bailey's Comets
The Ballad of Smokey the Bear
Barney Bear
Barney Google and Snuffy Smith
Basil Brush
Battle B-Daman
BattleTech: The Animated Series
Beany and Cecil
Beast Wars
Beetle Bailey
Benji, Zax and the Alien Prince
Benji's Very Own Christmas Story
The Berenstain Bears (originally on ABC)
The Berenstain Bears' Christmas Tree
Best Friends Whenever (2017–19)
Betty Boop
Bill & Ted's Excellent Adventures
Birdman and the Galaxy Trio
Blackstar
Blondie and Dagwood
Bluetoes the Christmas Elf
Bob in a Bottle
Bonkers
Bon Voyage, Charlie Brown (and Don't Come Back!!)
The Bots Master
The Boy from Andromeda
The Brady Kids
Brains & Brawn
Brandy & Mr. Whiskers (2005–09)
The Brave Frog
The Brave Frog's Greatest Adventure
Bubble Town Club (2010–12)
Buford and the Galloping Ghost
The Bugaloos
The Bugs Bunny/Road Runner Hour
The Bugs Bunny Show (usually airs on Nine Network)
Bugs Bunny Superstar
Bumpety Boo
Butch Cassidy and the Sundance Kids (originally aired on ABC)
Buzz Lightyear of Star Command
The Buzz on Maggie
Cabbage Patch Kids: First Christmas
Calvin and the Colonel
Camp Candy
Captain Caveman and the Teen Angels
Captain N: The Game Master
Captain Scarlet and the Mysterons
Cars Toons (2010)
Cartoon All-Stars to the Rescue
Casper and the Angels (originally aired on ABC)
Casper's First Christmas
CB Bears
The Centurions
Challenge of the GoBots
A Child's Christmas in Wales
Child's Play
Chip 'n Dale Rescue Rangers
Christmas Comes to Pac-Land
Christopher the Christmas Tree
A Chucklewood Easter
Clue Club (originally on Nine Network)
Clutch Cargo
Combo Niños (2009–12)
A Connecticut Yankee in King Arthur's Court
Cool McCool (also on Nine Network and Network Ten as Channel 0)
Cosmic Cowboys
Count Duckula (2009–11, originally on ABC and Network Ten)
The Count of Monte Cristo
Courageous Cat and Minute Mouse
Cow and Chicken
Crash & Bernstein (2015–18)
The Cricket on the Hearth
Crusader Rabbit
Da Möb
Danger Mouse (2009–11, originally on ABC)
Darkwing Duck
Dastardly and Muttley in Their Flying Machines (originally on Nine Network and Network Ten as Channel 0)
Dave the Barbarian
Defenders of the Earth
Dennis the Menace in Mayday for Mother
Deputy Dawg
The Devil and Daniel Mouse
Devlin
Dexter's Laboratory (later on Nine Network)
The Dick Tracy Show
Digimon Data Squad (2009–11)
Dog with a Blog (2014–19)
Donkey Kong
Dot and Spot's Magical Christmas
Doug
Drak Pack
Droopy
Droopy, Master Detective
DuckTales (1987)
Dumb and Dumber
Dungeons and Dragons (later on Network Ten)
Dynomutt, Dog Wonder
The Easter Bunny Is Comin' to Town
Easter Egg Mornin'''Ed, Edd n Eddy (later on Nine Network)Elephant BoyThe Elf Who Saved ChristmasEmmet Otter's Jug-Band ChristmasThe Emperor's New School (2006–10)The Evermoor Chronicles (2017–19)Fairy Tale FavoritesA Family Circus ChristmasFamily DogThe Famous Adventures of Mr. MagooFamous Classic TalesFantastic FourFantastic Max (originally on ABC)Fantastic VoyageFat Albert and the Cosby KidsFather Christmas and the Missing ReindeerFelix the Cat (originally on ABC Kids, sometimes shared with Network Ten in Victoria)Festival of Family ClassicsFillmore!Fireball XL5The First Easter RabbitThe First ChristmasThe First Christmas: The Story of the First Christmas SnowThe First Snow of Winter (originally on ABC Kids)Fish Hooks (2012–17)Fix & Foxi and FriendsThe Flight of DragonsA Flintstone ChristmasA Flintstones Christmas CarolA Flintstone Family ChristmasThe Flintstone Comedy ShowFlintstone FrolicsThe Flintstone KidsThe Flintstones (also on Nine Network, sometimes shared with Network Ten as Channel 0, later on 9Go!)The Flintstones Meet Rockula and FrankenstoneThe Flintstones: Little Big LeagueThe Flintstones' 25th Anniversary CelebrationFlipper (2009–11)Fluppy DogsFoofurFrankenstein Jr. and The ImpossiblesFrosty the SnowmanFrosty's Winter WonderlandThe Funky Phantom (originally on Nine Network)Galaxy Goof-Ups (originally on Nine Network)Galtar and the Golden LanceGamer's Guide to Pretty Much Everything (2016–19)GargoylesGargoyles: The Goliath ChroniclesGeorge and Junior's Christmas SpectacularGet Ed (2006–09)Girl Meets World (2017–19)GodzillaGood Luck Charlie (2011–17)Goof TroopGravedale HighGravity Falls (2013–19)The Great Grape Ape ShowThe Great Santa Claus CaperThe Greatest Adventure: Stories from the BibleGroovy Goolies (shared with Nine Network and Network Ten)Gumby (also on Nine Network, later on ABC)Hagar the HorribleHanna-Barbera Superstars 10Hannah Montana (2007–12)Happy Birthday BunnykinsHarry's Mad (2010)Harvey Girls Forever! (2019) (Seasons 1 and 2 only)He-Man and the Masters of the UniverseHeathcliffHeckle and JeckleHello Kitty's Furry Tale TheaterHercules: The Animated SeriesThe Herculoids (originally on Nine Network)Here Comes the GrumpHere Comes Peter CottontailHey There, It's Yogi Bear!Heyyy, It's the King!Hollyrock-a-Bye BabyA Hollywood Hounds ChristmasHong Kong Phooey (originally on Nine Network)Hot DogHouse of MouseHuckleberry Finn and His FriendsHuckleberry Hound (sometimes on Nine Network in Sydney)Hugo the HippoHunter's GoldI Am WeaselI Didn't Do It (2015–19)I'm in the Band (2012–14)I'm Telling!Inch High, Private Eye (originally on Nine Network)The Incredible HulkInhumanoidsIt's Punky Brewster!I Yabba-Dabba Do!IznogoudJabberjaw (originally on Nine Network)James Bond Jr.JeannieJessie (2013–19)The JetsonsJim Henson's Animal ShowJin Jin and the Panda PatrolJingle Bell RapJingle Bell RockJohnny Bravo (later on Nine Network)Jolly Old St. NicholasJONAS (2009–12)Jonas Brothers: Living the Dream (2010)Jonny Quest (originally on Network Ten as Channel 0)Josie and the Pussycats (originally on Nine Network, later on 9Go!)Josie and the Pussycats in Outer Space (originally on Nine Network, later on 9Go!)Journey to the Center of the EarthJourney to the Heart of the WorldJungle CubsJust WilliamK.C. Undercover (2016–18)Ken the Wolf BoyKick Buttowski: Suburban Daredevil (2012–15)Kickin' It (2014–18)The Kids from C.A.P.E.R.Kids IncorporatedKim Possible (2003–10)King Leonardo and His Short Subjects (originally on ABC, also on Nine Network and Network Ten as Channel 0)Kirby Buckets (2016–19)KissyfurKorg: 70,000 B.C.The Kwicky Koala ShowLab Rats (2015–19)Lamb Chop's Play-AlongLand of the LostLassie (also on ABC and Network Ten)The Last HalloweenThe Last of the MohicansA Laurel and Hardy Cartoon (originally on ABC and Network Ten)The Legend of Prince ValiantThe Legend of TarzanThe Legends of Treasure Island (2010, originally on ABC)The Leprechauns' Christmas GoldLife with LouieLilo and Stitch: The SeriesLinus the LionheartedThe LionheartsThe Little Crooked Christmas TreeLittle Golden Book LandThe Little MermaidLittle Orphan Annie's A Very Animated ChristmasThe Little RascalsThe Little TrainThe Little Troll PrinceLiv and Maddie (2014–19)Lloyd In SpaceThe Lone RangerLooney Tunes (usually airs on Nine Network)Mad ScientistMagic Boy's EasterThe Magical Adventures of QuasimodoMagilla Gorilla (originally on Nine Network and sometimes Network Ten as Channel 0)The Man Called FlintstoneMarsupilamiThe Marvel Super HeroesMarvin: Baby of the YearThe Mask: The Animated SeriesMasked RiderMaxie's WorldMaya the BeeMerrie Melodies (also on Nine Network)A Merry Mirthworm ChristmasMiami 7Micah's Christmas TreasureMichael Bentine's Potty Time (later on ABC)Mickey and DonaldMickey Mouse and FriendsThe Mickey Mouse Club (sometimes on Nine Network in Sydney)Mickey Mouse WorksMighty DucksMighty MaxMighty Med (2015–18)Mighty Morphin Alien RangersMighty Morphin Power RangersMighty MouseThe Mighty OrbotsMoby Dick and Mighty Mightor (originally on Nine Network)Mole's ChristmasMonster in My PocketMonster SquadThe Mouse FactoryMr. MagooMr. Willowby's Christmas TreeThe Mumbly Cartoon ShowMummies Alive!Mummy NannyThe Muppet Musicians of Bremen (originally on ABC)My Favorite Fairy TalesMy Pet MonsterNestor the Long-Eared Christmas DonkeyThe New Adventures of Black BeautyThe New Adventures of Flash GordonThe New Adventures of Madeline (originally on ABC, later returned to ABC)The New Adventures of Winnie the PoohThe New Fred and Barney ShowThe New Mickey Mouse ClubThe New Pink Panther ShowThe New Scooby and Scrappy-Doo ShowThe New Scooby-Doo Movies (originally on Nine)The New Scooby-Doo MysteriesThe New ShmooThe New Three Stooges (also on Network Ten)The New Yogi Bear ShowNick and NoelNick & PerryNightmare NedNoddy's Toyland AdventuresNorman NormalThe Nutcracker PrinceŌban Star-Racers (2007–09)The OsmondsOut of ControlPac-ManPaddle Pop: Atlantos (2016)Pair of Kings (2012–17)Pancho and RanchoPartridge Family 2200 A.D.Paw PawsThe Pebbles and Bamm-Bamm ShowPenn Zero: Part-Time Hero (2016–19)Pepper AnnThe Perils of Penelope Pitstop (originally on Nine Network)Phantom 2040Phantom AgentsPhineas and Ferb (2008–17)Pickle and Peanut (2017–19)Pingu (aired as a segment on The Book Place, now on ABC Kids)The Pink PantherThe Pink Panther in: A Pink ChristmasThe Pink Panther in: Olym-PinksThe Pink Panther in: Pink at First SightPinocchio's ChristmasThe Pirates of Dark WaterThe Plastic Man Comedy/Adventure ShowPoochiniPopeye and SonPopeye the SailorThe Porky Pig Show (usually on Nine Network, sometimes shared with Network Ten)Postman PatPotsworth & Co.Pound Puppies (1986, sometimes on Network Ten in Victoria)Power Rangers in SpacePower Rangers: Jungle Fury (2010–11)Power Rangers Lightspeed RescuePower Rangers Lost GalaxyPower Rangers: Mystic Force (2007–10)Power Rangers: Operation Overdrive (2008–11)Power Rangers RPM (2010–11)Power Rangers: Time ForcePower Rangers TurboPower Rangers ZeoThe Powerpuff GirlsPrankStars (2013–15)Press Gang (2010, originally on ABC Kids)Princess KnightThe Proud Family (2004–08)Pucca (2007–09)A Pup Named Scooby-DooThe Puzzle Club Easter AdventureQuack PackQuick Draw McGraw (sometimes on Nine Network)Race for Your Life, Charlie BrownRaggedy Ann and Andy: A Musical AdventureRaggedy Ann and Andy in The Great Santa Claus CaperRaggedy Ann and Andy in The Pumpkin Who Couldn't SmileRainbow (also on Nine Network and Network Ten)Rainbow BriteRandy Cunningham: 9th Grade Ninja (2015–18)Raw ToonageThe Real Adventures of Jonny QuestReBootRecessThe Replacements (2007–11)Return to the Planet of the ApesRichie RichRing RaidersThe Road Runner Show (usually on Nine Network)Robotech (originally on Network Ten)Rocket Robin HoodRocky and His FriendsRoger Ramjet (later on ABC)The Roman Holidays (originally on ABC)Romie-0 and Julie-8Rudolph and Frosty's Christmas in JulyThe Ruff & Reddy ShowS Club 7 in MiamiSabrina: The Animated SeriesSailor Moon (DIC dub, later on Network Ten)SaltySamurai Pizza CatsScience CourtScooby and Scrappy-Doo (originally on Nine Network)The Scooby-Doo Show (originally on Nine Network)Scooby-Doo, Where Are You! (originally on Nine Network)Scooby's All-Star Laff-A-Lympics (originally on Nine Network)Sealab 2020 (originally on ABC)Second Star to the LeftThe Secret ServiceSecret Squirrel (originally on ABC)Shake it Up (2012–16)Shazzan (originally on Nine Network)She-Ra: Princess of PowerSherlock Holmes in the 22nd CenturyShirley Temple's StorybookShirt TalesThe Shnookums and Meat Funny Cartoon ShowSilent Night, Holy NightSilver HawksThe Skatebirds (originally on Nine Network)Sky CommandersThe SmurfsSnagglepuss (also on Nine Network)Snorks (also on Nine Network in Adelaide)Sonic the HedgehogSonic UndergroundSonic X (Jetix version)Sonny with a Chance (2010–13)So Random! (2012–15)SpaceCatsThe Space ExplorersSpace Ghost (originally on Nine Network, sometimes on Network Ten as Channel 0)The Space Kidettes (originally on Nine Network)Space KnightsSpace StarsSpace StrikersA Special Sesame Street Christmas (only Sesame Street special on Seven, all other specials on ABC)Speed Buggy (originally on ABC)Speed Racer (originally on ABC and Network Ten, later on ABC)Spunky and TadpoleSquigglevisionThe Stableboy's ChristmasStar Trek: The Animated Series (originally on Nine Network, later on ELEVEN)Star vs. the Forces of Evil (2017–19)Star Wars Rebels (2014–18, moved to 9Go!)The Stingiest Man in TownStitch! (2011–13)The Story of the Little TreeThe Super 6The Super GlobetrottersSuper Robot Monkey Team Hyperforce Go! (2005–09)SWAT Kats: The Radical SquadronTales of Washington IrvingTaleSpinTarzan and the Super 7Teacher's PetTeamo Supremo (2003–08)Teenage Mutant Ninja Turtles (1987, later on ELEVEN)TerrahawksThat's So RavenThese Are the DaysThe ThingThomas & FriendsThundarr the Barbarian (originally on Network Ten)Thunderbirds 2086Thundercats (1986)Timeless Tales from HallmarkTimon & PumbaaThe Tiny TreeTom and JerryTom and Jerry's 50th Birthday BashTom and Jerry KidsThe Tom and Jerry ShowTom TerrificThe Tomfoolery ShowThe Tomorrow PeopleTop Cat (originally on Nine Network, later on 9Go!)Touché Turtle and Dum Dum (originally on Nine Network)The Town That Santa ForgotToxic CrusadersTractor Tom (later moved to ABC Kids)TransformersTransformers: The MovieTravels of Marco PoloTrollkinsThe Trolls and the Christmas ExpressTukiki and His Search for a Merry ChristmasThe Twelve Gifts Ultimate Spider-Man (2013–15)Uncle Croc's Block (shares with Nine Network)UnderdogThe Velveteen RabbitVictor and Hugo: Bunglers in Crime (2009–10, originally on ABC)Video PowerVoltron: The Third DimensionWacky Races (originally aired on Nine Network)The Wacky World of Tex AveryWander Over Yonder (2015–19)The WeekendersWeird-Oh'sWhat About Mimi?The What-A-Cartoon! ShowWhich Witch is Which?Why the Bears Dance on Christmas Eve The Wind in the Willows (1984 TV series) (2009–11, originally on ABC)
 The Wind in the Willows (1987 film)Win, Lose or Draw (2015, 2017)W.I.T.C.H. (2005–09)Wizards of Waverly Place (2008–14)Woody WoodpeckerWoof! (2010, originally on Nine Network and ABC)The World of ToshThe WuzzlesThe Year Without a Santa ClausThe YearlingYin Yang Yo! (2008–11)Yo Yogi!Yogi BearYogi Bear's All Star Comedy Christmas CaperYogi the Easter BearYogi's Ark LarkYogi's First ChristmasYogi's Gang (shared with Network Ten)Yogi's Space RaceYogi's Treasure HuntYoung Robin HoodYoung Samson and GoliathYvon of the YukonZeke and Luther (2012–16)Zoo Life with Jack HannaZoopopsPreschoolArt Attack (2013–18)The Book of PoohDoc McStuffins (2013–19)Handy Manny (2009–16)Henry Hugglemonster (2014–19)Jake and the Never Land Pirates (2012–19)The Lion Guard (2016–19, moved to 9Go!)Mickey Mouse Clubhouse (2007–18)Miles From Tomorrowland (2015–18)My Friends Tigger & Pooh (2008–10)PB&J OtterSheriff Callie's Wild West (2015–17)Sofia the First (2013–19, moved to 9Go!)Stanley (2004–08)

Sports
 Commonwealth Games: Manchester 2002, Gold Coast 2018 
 Rugby league: Rugby league World Cup (2013, 2017)
 Tennis: French Open (2002), Wimbledon (2011–2020 on Seven & 7TWO)
 Winter Olympic Games: PyeongChang 2018

Annual eventsGrammy Awards'' (2018–2019, 2022)

See also

 List of programs broadcast by ABC Television
 List of programs broadcast by Network 10
 List of programs broadcast by Nine Network
 List of programs broadcast by Special Broadcasting Service
 List of Australian television series

References

External links

Seven Network

Seven Network